Raynoch Joseph Thompson (born November 21, 1977) is a former American football linebacker in the National Football League. He was drafted by the Arizona Cardinals in the second round (45th overall) of the 2000 NFL Draft out of the University of Tennessee. He spent 5 years for the Cardinals, until they released him at the end of the 2004 season. After his time with the Cardinals, he signed with the Green Bay Packers, but they cut him before the season. He was an All-American and a Butkus Award Finalist in 1997 and 1998. He was an important part of the University of Tennessee National Championship team that went undefeated in 1998.

1977 births
Living people
St. Augustine High School (New Orleans) alumni
Players of American football from Los Angeles
American football linebackers
Tennessee Volunteers football players
Arizona Cardinals players
Players of American football from New Orleans